Mohammad Sanaullah Bangladesh Nationalist Party politician and Physician. He was elected a member of parliament from Undivided Dhaka-22 (Present Gazipur-4) in 1979.

Early life 
Mohammad Sanaullah was born into a Bengali Muslim family in Kapasia, Gazipur District.

Career 
Mohammad Sanaullah was a doctor. He was elected a member of parliament from Undivided Dhaka-22 (Present Gazipur-4) in 1979 Bangladeshi general election.

References 

People from Kapasia Upazila
Bangladesh Nationalist Party politicians
2nd Jatiya Sangsad members
20th-century Bengalis